Liam Paul Angel (born 17 March 1999) is a Welsh professional football defender who plays for Merthyr Town.

Early life
As a teenager, Angel attended Pontllanfraith Comprehensive School.

Career
Angel was a member of the Cardiff City academy and captained the club's under-16 side but was released at the age of 16 after not being offered a scholarship. In 2015, he joined the academy of Football League Two side Newport County, manager Terry Butcher describing Angel as having "a sweet left foot for a defender and he's a good talker as well". He signed his first professional contract with Newport County in February 2016. Angel made his senior debut for Newport at the age of 17 on 30 August 2016 in a 4–1 defeat to Plymouth Argyle in the first round of the EFL Trophy

On 9 May 2017 Angel was released by Newport at the end of the 2016-17 season. He later joined Cinderford Town.
Liam is now working hard at Dow Chemicals Barry and is known better as little Geoff

International
Angel was part of the winning Wales under-16 squad in the Victory Shield in November 2014, scoring the only goal of the game in a 1–0 victory over England. In 2015, he was called into the Wales Under 17 squad and in August 2016 for the Wales Under 19 squad.

Career statistics

References

External links

Living people
1999 births
Welsh footballers
Association football defenders
Cardiff City F.C. players
Newport County A.F.C. players
Cinderford Town A.F.C. players